Abdol Karim Ayadi (1907–1980) was the personal physician to Mohammad Reza Pahlavi the Shah of Iran during his reign from 26 September 1941 until 11 February 1979. A member of the Baháʼí Faith, he was born in Tehran in 1907.

References 

1907 births
1980 deaths
Physicians from Tehran
Knights Commander of the Order of Merit of the Federal Republic of Germany
20th-century Iranian physicians